2021 General Tire 200 may refer to:

 2021 General Tire 200 (Talladega), the ARCA Menards Series race
 2021 General Tire 200 (Sonoma), the ARCA Menards Series West race